{{Speciesbox
| image = Drosera finlaysoniana PB190674.jpg
| image_caption =
| genus = Drosera
| species = finlaysoniana
| authority = Wall. ex Arn.
| synonyms =  Drosera angustifolia F.Muell.
<small>Drosera indica f. robusta F.M.Bailey</small>
| synonyms_ref = 
}}Drosera finlaysoniana is a carnivorous herb found in Australia and south east Asia. More commonly found in the north of Australia. In southern Australian sites it has been recorded at inland areas, in eucalyptus woodlands subject to flooding. Also found in Hainan, Taiwan, the Indo-China region and the Philippines.D. finlaysoniana was described (as D. Finlaysoni) by Nathaniel Wallich in 1837. The original specific epithet, Finlaysoni, honoured George Finlayson, who collected the specimen described by Wallich from Turow Bay, Cochin China.  The name, D. finlaysoniana,  is accepted by Australian authorities. and by Plants of the World Online, and WCSP, but not by World Flora Online. For some time, this species was considered synonymous with D. indica'', but in 2013 Russell Barrett & Allen Lowrie resurrected it, noting that

 "the stalked glandular hairs at the base of the (leaf) lamina do not reach all the way to the stem"
 "there are only a few short, simple hairs among the glandular hairs at the base of the lamina"
 "anthers are classed as normal, not hooded or dilated"
 "seeds have a distinctly reticulate surface" and
 are "relatively small".

References

External links
Drosera finlaysoniana: images and occurrence data from GBIF

Carnivorous plants of Australia
Plants described in 1837
finlaysoniana
Caryophyllales of Australia
Eudicots of Western Australia
Flora of South Australia
Flora of Queensland
Flora of New South Wales
Flora of Victoria (Australia)
Flora of Asia
Flora of the Philippines
Flora of Hainan
Taxa named by Nathaniel Wallich